Clinical Laboratory is a monthly peer-reviewed medical journal covering all aspects of laboratory medicine and transfusion medicine as well as tissue transplantation and hematopoietic, cellular, and gene therapies. It was established in 1955 as Das ärztliche Laboratorium: Zeitschrift für den Laboratoriumsarzt und die ärztliche Praxis. The title was changed to Klinisches Labor in 1991 with the English subtitle Clinical Laboratory. The English title became the sole title from 1997. The editor-in-chief is Michael F. Holick.

Abstracting and indexing
The journal is abstracted and indexed in Chemical Abstracts, Current Contents/Clinical Medicine, Index Medicus/MEDLINE/PubMed, Science Citation Index Expanded, and Scopus. According to the Journal Citation Reports, the journal has a 2015 impact factor of 1.224.

Editors-in-chief
The following persons have been editor-in-chief of the journal:
Heinrich Schmidt-Gayk (–2007)
Michael F. Holick (since 2007)

References

External links

Laboratory medicine journals
Publications established in 1955
English-language journals
Monthly journals